Karin Elizabet Andersson (8 October 1918 – 20 July 2012) was a Swedish politician who served as Minister for Gender Equality from 1979 to 1982. Born into a farm family as one of six children, her father Elias served as municipal councillor in Varberg Municipality. She began working for Hallands Nyheter as a journalist in 1947, then worked for Ålandstidningen until 1957. In the 1960s, Andersson worked with Sveriges Radio, and also began to get involved with the Centre Party, and became the party's federal secretary in 1966, serving in that position until 1979.

In 1966, Andersson was elected to Stockholm City Council, and in 1971 she became a member of the Riksdag, serving until 1985. In 1979, she was named Minister for Gender Equality under Prime Minister Thorbjörn Fälldin. She had originally planned to step down from the Riksdag and turn down the position, but eventually accepted, and served as Minister until 1982. As Minister, her focus was on gender equality in the workforce, but also on issue pertaining to immigrants and refugees entering the country. After leaving politics behind, she retired to her farm in Halland, where she spent the rest of her life.

References

Further reading
 

1918 births
2012 deaths
Members of the Riksdag from the Centre Party (Sweden)
Swedish Ministers for Gender Equality
Women government ministers of Sweden
20th-century Swedish women politicians
20th-century Swedish politicians